Daniele Simoncelli (born 28 December 1989) is an Italian footballer who plays for Correggese.

Career

Brescia
Born in Cattolica, Romagna region, Simoncelli started his career at Lombard club Brescia. In January 2007 he spent 6 months with Serie D club Rodengo–Saiano. in 2007–08 he returned to Brescia for its reserve. In 2008–09 season he was loaned to Olbia of the fourth division.

Barletta
In summer 2009 Simoncelli was signed by another fourth division club Barletta in co-ownership deal. The team won promotion to the third division as play-offs winner. In June 2010 Brescia gave up the remain 50% registration rights to Barletta. He scored 4 league goals in his maiden Lega Pro Prima Divisione season. On 2 September 2011 his contract was extended to last until 30 June 2014. Simoncelli made 40 more league appearances for Barletta from 2011 to 2013, about half of them were substitutes, scoring twice only. On 6 August 2013 his contract was terminated in mutual consent.

Savona
On 23 January 2014 he was signed by Savona F.B.C.

Pordenone
On 21 July 2014 Simoncelli was signed by Pordenone in a 1-year contract.

Rimini
On 3 June 2018, he signed a new contract to keep him at Rimini until 2019.

Monterosi
On 24 August 2019, he joined Serie D club Monterosi.

On September 2021, he moved to Correggese. He played 34 Serie D matches, and was the captain of the team.

References

External links
 AIC profile (data by football.it) 
 

1989 births
Living people
Sportspeople from the Province of Rimini
Footballers from Emilia-Romagna
Italian footballers
Association football forwards
Serie C players
Lega Pro Seconda Divisione players
Serie D players
Brescia Calcio players
A.C. Rodengo Saiano players
Olbia Calcio 1905 players
A.S.D. Barletta 1922 players
Savona F.B.C. players
Pordenone Calcio players
Rimini F.C. 1912 players
S.S.D. Correggese Calcio 1948 players